Georgia State Route 12 Truck may refer to:

 Georgia State Route 12 Truck (Madison): a truck route of State Route 12 that exists in Madison
 Georgia State Route 12 Truck (Warrenton): a truck route designation for State Route 12 Bypass (Warrenton)

012 Truck